Noryang Bridge (Hangul: 노량대교) or Second Namhae Bridge is a suspension bridge that connects Hadong Noryang and Namhae Noryang, South Korea. It carries the National Route 19 near the Namhae Bridge inaugurated in 1973.

References

See also
 Transportation in South Korea
 List of bridges in South Korea

External links

 

Suspension bridges in South Korea
Bridges completed in 2018
Road bridges